James Bert Garner (September 2, 1870 – November 28, 1960) was an American chemical engineer and professor at the Mellon Institute of Industrial Research from 1914 until his retirement in 1957. He is credited with the invention of a World War I gas mask design in 1915.

Accomplishments
Garner graduated from Wabash College in 1893 with a Bachelor of Science degree and studied under the renowned Dr. Alexander Smith.

In 1895, after receiving a Master of Science degree from Wabash and  teaching there, he went at Smith's invitation to the University of Chicago for a teaching appointment. This is where he was first exposed to the principle he later used in a charcoal gas mask. It was part of his duties to set up experiments on the lecture tables.  In an effort to find a demonstration that would seem especially dramatic, he turned to a little used one from a well-known source-book, G. S. Newth's Chemical Lecture Experiments.

What his students saw was a long cylinder filled with mercury, immersed in a vessel also filled with mercury.  When ammonia was generated through a glass delivery tube, the mercury in the beaker came down into the container vessel.  That was when Garner applied the touch of drama.  When he placed a stick of activated charcoal into the vessel the tube of the mercury again shot to the top of the cylinder.

Dr. Garner's purpose was to fix in his students' memory a mental picture of how ammonia gas was adsorbed by wood charcoal.  It made an even more lasting impression upon the instructor but it was a good many years before he was able to make use of it.".

In 1897, Garner received a Ph.D. in Physical [Organic] Chemistry and became head of the Chemistry Department at Bradley Polytechnic Institute in Peoria, Illinois where he taught until 1901 and continued these experiments.

From 1901 to 1914, Garner served as the head of the Chemistry Department at Wabash College.  "For 14 years under Dr. Garner the Wabash chemistry department showed one of its greatest periods of productivity with at least 18 future Ph.D's graduated"  (Ibid, p. 8).

Gas mask

After reading an account of a gas attack by the German Army on Canadian and French troops at the Battle of Gravenstafel near Ypres on April 22, 1915, Garner hypothesized that chlorine gas had been used. Based on research he had performed while at the University of Chicago he believed that activated charcoal would adsorb the gas. After performing a successful test using two of his associates who were exposed to gas in a sealed room while wearing Dr. Garner's gas mask.

The following excerpt relates to Garner's research into the gas mask.

In addition to gas mask development, Dr. Garner was also involved in many other discoveries and inventions. For example, in June 1916 Garner patented a process of obtaining gasoline from natural gas, and in July 1936 he patented a process for extracting nicotine from tobacco, in addition to numerous other patents throughout his career.

References

Dr. Garner of Bethel, Gas Mask Inventor Dies Here at 90," Journal Review, Crawfordsville [IN]
The Richmond Times Dispatch 30 November 1960
The Palo Alto Times 30 November 1960
Phoenix Arizona Gazette, 30 November 1960
The Washington D.C. Post, 29 November 1960
Keeping Up with the Universe--5 Pittsburgh Contributors to the  Britannica Assist in the Complex Job of Revising Its 27,247 pages," by John Warren Pg. 6, Pittsburgh Press, 8 June 1958
Pioneer Scientist: The Story of James Bert Garner, Gas Mask Inventor -

External links
Reference to James B. Garner's gas mask being used in WWI - pg. 4
50th Anniversary Booklet - Pittsburgh Section of the American Chemical Society. Mention of J.B. Garner gas mask with pictures - pgs. 4 & 6 (pages 16 & 18 in original hard copy) 
Quote by J.B. Garner on Wabash College site

1870 births
1960 deaths
American chemists
20th-century American inventors
Engineers from Pennsylvania
Wabash College alumni
American chemical engineers
Scientists from Pennsylvania
Inventors from Pennsylvania